Katissa is a genus of anyphaenid sac spiders first described by Antônio Brescovit in 1997.

Species
 it contains ten species:
Katissa delicatula (Banks, 1909) – Costa Rica
Katissa elegans (Banks, 1909) – Costa Rica
Katissa guyasamini Dupérré & Tapia, 2016 – Ecuador
Katissa kurusiki Dupérré & Tapia, 2016 – Ecuador
Katissa lycosoides (Chickering, 1937) – Panama
Katissa puyu Dupérré & Tapia, 2016 – Ecuador
Katissa simplicipalpis (Simon, 1898) – Lesser Antilles, Panama, Peru
Katissa tamya Dupérré & Tapia, 2016 – Ecuador
Katissa yaya Dupérré & Tapia, 2016 – Ecuador
Katissa zimarae (Reimoser, 1939) – Costa Rica

References

Anyphaenidae
Araneomorphae genera
Spiders of Central America
Spiders of South America
Taxa named by Antônio Brescovit